Koumaria is an Aromanian (Vlach) village and a community of the Veroia municipality. Since the 2011 local government reform it was part of the municipality Veroia, of which it was a municipal district. The 2011 census recorded 243 residents in the village and 339 in the community. The community of Koumaria covers an area of 139.132 km2.

Administrative division
The community of Koumaria consists of two separate settlements: 
Koumaria (population 243)
Xirolivado (population 96)
The aforementioned population figures are as of 2011.

See also
List of settlements in Imathia

References

Populated places in Imathia
Aromanian settlements in Greece